Cody Hodges (born November 20, 1982) is a philanthropist, motivational speaker, and former professional American football player, playing in the National Football League (NFL), Arena Football League (AFL), and the Arena League 2. Hodges is best known for his one season as the starting quarterback for the Texas Tech Red Raiders during the 2005 season. As a fifth year Senior, he led the nation in passing and total offense and an appearance in the 2006 Cotton Bowl Classic and a 9–3 overall record. He was the 3rd straight fifth year senior to start for Mike Leach and Texas Tech and was also the second of 4 West Texas natives to take the quarterback reins in the Leach era, along with predecessor Sonny Cumbie and successors Taylor Potts and Seth Doege.

High school and early years
Hodges was born to Steve and Sharon Hodges in Amarillo, Texas, and was raised in Hereford, Texas, located in the Texas Panhandle. Hodges played high school football at Hereford High School, where he was a 4-year letterman in football and a standout in basketball. He threw for 2,458 yards and 28 touchdowns in 2000 as a senior. He ended his prep career with a 22-4 record as starting quarterback and accounted for 70 touchdown passes and 6,500 passing yards over four years and ran for 30 touchdowns during that time. Hodges was also a two-time 3-4A District MVP. Hodges was named Amarillo Globe-News Newcomer of the Year in 1997, Amarillo Globe-News Player of the Year his Junior and Senior years, and was also named All-South Plains Player of the Year in 2000. He was named to the Second-team all-state in 1999. Hodges was named to the Lubbock Avalanche-Journal Top 100 players and was ranked by Lonestar.com as one of the top 100 quarterbacks in the nation. Despite his stellar high school career, Hodges was only offered scholarships by two FBS schools, Texas Tech University and The University of Wyoming. Hodges accepted a scholarship from Texas Tech coach Mike Leach.

Early college career, 2001–2004
Hodges redshirted his first year at Texas Tech in 2001. He made his career debut against Baylor University as a redshirt Freshman in 2002, completing 1 pass for 10 yards. Hodges served as backup for 4 years, backing up Kliff Kingsbury, B. J. Symons, and Sonny Cumbie. Hodges moved up a slot in the depth chart every single year. From 2001-2004 Hodges appeared in 7 games, completing 8 passes out of 12 attempts for 70 yards and 2 touchdowns, completing 67 percent of his passes. He also rushed for 33 yards on 3 attempts.

2005 season
Hodges won the starting Quarterback job for the 2005 season, winning a hard fought battle over highly touted redshirt freshman Graham Harrell. He started out the year in stellar fashion, putting up big time numbers in blowout wins over Florida International University 56-3, Indiana State University 63-7, and Sam Houston State University 80-21. Hodges drew controversy after the win against SHSU by saying that he believed Tech's offense was good enough to "score 100 points." Big 12 play started and he led the Red Raiders to a win over Kansas 30-17. The Red Raiders then traveled to Lincoln, Nebraska to play the University of Nebraska Cornhuskers. The Huskers were playing on their homecoming day and were looking to take revenge for being humiliated by Tech the previous year in Lubbock by giving up 70 points. Hodges led the Raiders on a game-winning drive and threw a 10-yard touchdown pass on 4th down to win the game and snap Nebraska's 36 year homecoming winning streak. Hodges had a career day the next week as Tech beat Kansas State, 59-20. Hodges threw for 646 yards for a career best. After the big win against Nebraska and the career day against KSU, Hodges led the Red Raiders, ranked in the top 10 for the first time under Mike Leach, to Austin, Texas to face off with the eventual national champion Texas Longhorns led by Vince Young. Hodges had the Raiders in an early lead in Austin, but could not keep up the momentum as Tech suffered their first loss, 52-17. Tech rebounded with wins over rivals Baylor 28-0, and Texas A&M 56-17. Tech later lost on a BCS bowl bid by being upset by a 4 win Oklahoma State team, 24-17. The Raiders rebounded to defeat Oklahoma 23-21 in another close and exciting game with Hodges leading the Raiders on the final drive, giving the Red Raiders a regular season record of 9-2, and a Big 12 record of 6-2, giving them second place overall in the Big 12 and an invitation to the Cotton Bowl. Hodges finished the regular season first in the nation in passing, making him the 4th consecutive Tech QB to do so.

2006 Cotton Bowl Classic
Hodges led the 9-2 (6-2 in Big 12 play) Red Raiders, ranked #18 in the AP Poll and #1 in total offense, to the 2006 Cotton Bowl Classic to play the #13 Alabama Crimson Tide, ranking #1 in scoring defense and #2 in total defense. Hodges, statistically, had his worst game as a starter, completing only 15 of 32 passes for 196 yards and one touchdown. He was also Tech's leading rusher, gaining 66 yards on 17 carries. Texas Tech eventually lost 13-10 and ended the season with a 9–3 overall record and #20 in the AP Poll. Hodges finished his career at Tech completing 360 passes out of 543 attempts for 4,308 yards with 33 passing touchdowns and 13 interceptions. He also rushed for 224 career yards and 3 rushing touchdowns. Hodges was noted to be the best running quarterback Tech had, and also his passing form, in which he threw his passes without the aid of the laces of the Football.

Professional career

Tennessee Titans
Despite a successful 2005 season, Hodges went undrafted in the 2006 NFL Draft. However, Hodges was signed by the Tennessee Titans. He came second to the top pick of the Tennessee Titans Vince Young and was Young's back-up at quarterback. Hodges performed well in the pre-season, but was released when the Titans signed Kerry Collins to back up Young.

Arena League
Hodges signed in 2006 as the quarterback for the Oklahoma City Yard Dawgz of af2. He was traded in 2007, to the Fort Wayne Fusion. Hodges was named the Schutt Offensive Player of the Game during Week 1 of the af2 season for his performance against the Green Bay Blizzard. He later ended his season due to injury. Despite a successful AFL career, Hodges retired from playing Football in 2008.

Rachel's Challenge work
Hodges, having viewed a presentation from Rachel's Challenge, an organization dedicated to abolishing prejudice and promoting kindness and good deeds, was inspired to join the organization as a speaker at age 20. After his professional football career ended, he joined Rachel's Challenge as a full-time motivational speaker and engaging in philanthropy on behalf of the organization as well. Hodges frequents smaller High Schools in rural towns across America to spread the message of kindness to others.

Personal
Hodges is married,  and lives in the Dallas-Ft. Worth Metroplex, when not traveling the country with Rachel's challenge. His father played football at the University of Houston. He also has a twin brother, Slade Hodges, who played slot receiver for Texas Tech in the same years as his brother. Cody completed a 10-yard pass to his brother during the 2005 Texas Tech-Texas A&M game, and later watched from the sidelines as his brother caught a touchdown in the 4th quarter of the same game.

References

External links
Cody Hodges Bio at Texas Tech Athletics

1982 births
Living people
Sportspeople from Amarillo, Texas
American football quarterbacks
Texas Tech Red Raiders football players
Tennessee Titans players
Fort Wayne Fusion players
Oklahoma City Yard Dawgz players
People from Hereford, Texas
Players of American football from Texas